The Tassiné River is a river in northeast Benin. It is a tributary of the Sota River.

References

Rivers of Benin